MPEG-1 Audio Layer III HD more commonly known and advertised by its abbreviation mp3HD is an audio compression codec developed by Technicolor formerly known as Thomson. It achieves lossless data compression, and is backwards compatible with the MP3 format by storing two data streams in one file.

As of April 2013, the MP3HD website, specification and encoder software are no longer available, and promotion of the format appears to have been abandoned.

Development
mp3HD was released in March 2009 as a lossless competitor to the already popular FLAC, Apple Lossless, and WavPack. In theory, the format provides a convenient container in the form of a single file, which includes the standard lossy stream playable on any mp3-capable device and the lossless data which is stored in the ID3v2 tag. To play the lossless data, the user needs a compatible mp3HD player with decoder - otherwise, only the lossy data will be played. Also, being a compression method, files produced by the algorithm are substantially smaller than the uncompressed source files, though they are roughly comparable to other similar lossless formats. The format is still in development with Technicolor releasing tools for consumers who are into the format. Sites are saying that it can be the one that achieves mainstream adoption, due to the advantage that the mp3 brand is well known. Since 2009 Technicolor has updated the format and encoding tools to make it more efficient, while also adding a plugin for Winamp (Windows only), a DirectShow filter for Windows Media Player, and a mp3HD converter. On October 7, 2010, Topspin, a music distributor became the first retailer to start offering mp3HD files, stating that now their customers can have lossless audio without leaving the mp3 format. Technicolor are also saying that the agreement is very important for the growth of the format. Starting June 19, 2011 Technicolor and 10 ambassadors and Sound Souvenirs are doing a marketing campaign where they will transform 10 songs into mp3HD. People get to vote for 100 songs from their top charts which ends July 21 and the top 10 get to be mp3HD files.

Encoding
So far, the only available mp3HD encoder is the Technicolor toolkit which contains a command-line encoder and decoder. This can be used with the Exact Audio Copy to rip CDs into WAVE files and then automatically convert them to mp3HD files. Another method, only available for  Windows is the mp3HD Converter, which converts already uncompressed WAVE files to mp3HD and can also decompress them back to WAVE files. Currently mp3HD supports CD audio (PCM) at 44.1 and 48 kHz sampling rates at 16 bit/sample. Nero Burning Rom also supports converting to mp3HD with Nero Recode.

Audio quality
The lossless mp3HD stream allows for 100% bit-exact replication of CD-quality audio tracks. The lossy stream uses the same bit rates as a normal mp3 file and the lossy portion can even use VBR or CBR depending on the user's preference for compression and quality.

Pros and cons
Pros
Exact replica of a CD
Lossy/lossless hybrid
Size is about the same compared to other lossless formats
Backwards compatible with standard MP3 players
retains .mp3 file extension
Embedded mp3 track and the mp3HD file share the same ID3 metadata
Popularity of the mp3 brand

Cons
Not very widespread
Lack of support
Bigger than standard mp3
No quality boost if player only supports standard mp3
The lossless part is stored in an ID3v2 tag.
Editing certain information in the ID3v2 tag can sometimes result in losing the lossless data stored in the tag, making the mp3HD file a standard MP3.

Products that support mp3HD
Hardware
Samsung IceTouch (YP-H1), Samsung announced that they will be releasing the first mp3 player capable of playing mp3HD lossless part of the format at CES 2010. They were supposed to be released sometime in 2010, but as of April 8, 2011 nothing has been released.
Samsung YP-Z3 is the world first mp3 player released to support mp3HD (released end of August 2011)
Samsung YP-R2 (released in November 2011)

Software
Winamp w/ plugin (Windows only)
Windows Media Player w/ direct show filter
mp3/HD/surround/SX player (Windows and Mac)

Alternative technologies
Lossless
FLAC
WavPack
TTA
Apple Lossless

See also
 Lossless Compression
 Lossy Compression
 Audio Compression

References

External links
Technical specification
Download

Audio codecs
Digital audio
Lossless audio codecs
MP3
MPEG
Technicolor SA